Urocoptidae is a family of air-breathing land snails, terrestrial pulmonate gastropod mollusks in the superfamily Urocoptoidea.

Taxonomy

2005 taxonomy 
The family Urocoptidae was classified in the superfamily Orthalicoidea (according to the taxonomy of the Gastropoda by Bouchet & Rocroi, 2005).

The family Urocoptidae consists of 7 subfamilies (according to the taxonomy of the Gastropoda by Bouchet & Rocroi, 2005):
 Urocoptinae Pilsbry, 1898 (1868) - synonym: Cylindrellidae Tryon, 1868
 Apomatinae Paul, 1982
 Brachypodellinae H. B. Baker, 1956
 Eucalodiinae P. Fischer & Crosse, 1873
 Holospirinae Pilsbry, 1946
 Microceraminae Pilsbry, 1904 - synonyms: Johaniceraminae Jaume & de la Torre, 1972; Macroceraminae Jaume & de la Torre, 1972
 Tetrentodontinae Bartsch, 1943

2008 taxonomy 
Uit de Weerd (2008) moved the Urocoptidae to the newly established superfamily Urocoptoidea based on molecular phylogeny research.

The following cladogram based on Bayesian analysis of sequences of 28S ribosomal RNA shows the phylogenic relations within the Urocoptoidea. There are up to 2008 genetically analyzed species of Urocoptidae and one species of Cerionidae marked in khaki color in the cladogram.

2012 taxonomy 
Fred G. Thompson established the family Epirobiidae in 2012 for five genera of snails (Epirobia, Propilsbrya, Pectinistemma, Gyrocion, Prionoloplax), that were previously placed within Urocoptidae. Data from molecular phylogeny research as well as morphology supports monophyly of Holospiridae Pilsbry, 1946 and the Eucalodiidae Crosse & Fischer, 1868.

Genera 
Genera in the family Urocoptidae include:

Urocoptinae
 Autocoptis Pilsbry, 1902
 Brachypodella L. Pfeiffer, 1840 (as Cylindrella)
 Urocoptis Beck, 1837 - type genus of the family Urocoptidae

Apominae
 Apoma Beck, 1837 - type genus of the subfamily Apomatinae
 Simplicervix Pilsbry, 1903

Brachypodellinae
 Brachypodella Beck, 1837 - type genus of the subfamily Brachypodellinae

Eucalodiinae
 Anisospira Strebel, 1880
 Archegocoptis Pilsbry, 1903
†Condonella McLellan, 1927
 Dissotropis Bartsch, 1906
 Eucalodium Crosse & P. Fischer, 1868 - type genus of the subfamily Eucalodiinae

Holospirinae
 Coelostemma Dall, 1895

 Hendersoniella Dall, 1905
 Holospira Martens, 1860 - type genus of the subfamily Holospirinae

Microceraminae
 Microceramus Pilsbry & Vanatta, 1898 - type genus of the subfamily Microceraminae
 Macroceramus Guilding, 1828

Tetrentodontinae
 Tetrentodon Pilsbry, 1903 - type genus of the subfamily Tetrentodontinae
 Torrecoptis Bartsch, 1943

Other genera include:
 Allocoptis Thompson & Franz, 1976
 Amphicosmia Pilsbry & Vanatta, 1898
 Anoma
 Arangia
 Bactrocoptis
 Badiofax
 Bostrichocentrum
 Bostrychocentrum
 Callonia
 Centralia
 Cochlodinella
 Coelocentrum
 Geoscala
 Gongylostoma
 Gyraxis
 Haplocion
 Heterocoptis
 Idiostemma
 Liocallonia
 Metastoma
 Mychostoma
 Nesocoptis
 Nodulia
 Oligostylus
 Organocoptis
 Pfeiffericoptis
 Pineria
 Pleurostemma
 Poeycoptis
 Pseudopineria
 Pycnoptychia Pilsbry & Vanatta, 1898
 Sagracoptis
 Spiroceramus
 Spirostemma
 Strophina
 Tomelasmus
 Trilamellaxis
 Uncinicoptis

References

Further reading 
 ; 7 figs.
 Carlos de la Torre. 1912. New Cuban Urocoptis of the U. cinerea group. The Nautilus, volume 26, number 4, pages 55-58, plate 6.
 Kabat A. R., Herschler R. & González G. A. (2012). "Resolution of taxonomic problems associated with the complex publication history of the seminal Torre and Bartsch monograph on Cuban Urocoptidae (Gastropoda, Pulmonata)". Zootaxa 3362: 43-53. PDF.
 Pilsbry H. A. & Henderson J. B. jr. (February 1913). Two new Cuban Urocoptidae. The Nautilus, volume 26, number 10, pages 109-110.
  Miguel L. Jaume & Alfredo de la Torre. 1976. Los Urocoptidae de Cuba (Mollusca-Pulmonata). Série 4: Ciencias biologicas; no. 53. La Habana, Cuba: Centro de Información Cientifica y Tecnica, 122 pp.

 Richardson C. L. 1991. Urocoptidae: catalogue of species. Tryonia 22: 1-245.
 Tryon G. W. (1903) Manual of Conchology. Second series: Pulmonata. Volume 15. Urocoptidae. Continued by H. A. Pilsbry.

External links 

 photos
 photos
 blog Bram's Snail Site with photos